Martha Eriksdotter (Märta Bonde) was the alleged daughter of Erik X, King of Sweden, flourishing in the first half of the 13th century. However, knowledge about her is derived from a genealogy added to a 15th-century copy of the Erikskrönikan. This genealogy may have been part of the ambition of Charles VIII of Sweden (d. 1470) to prove his right to the throne by presenting a more impressive family background. The existence of Martha Eriksdotter and her marriage have therefore been doubted by some modern Swedish historians, who think she was just made up by Charles or his chancellery. Nevertheless, a few historians have maintained that her position cannot be entirely explained as a forgery.

Family life
According to the genealogy she was married to Nils Sixtensson Sparre, a Marshal in Sweden. Martha’s paternity and her marriage are recorded in the book Anteckningar om svenska qvinnor by PG Berg and Wilhelmina Stålberg, Page 274. The title of the book in English is: Notes on Swedish women. (A biographical dictionary from 1864, covering only Swedish women.)

In Swedish the page reads:

Märtha, dotter af Erik X, som blef gift med Nils Sixtensson till Tofta, och, genom detta äktenskap, stammoder för Sparre- och Oxenstjerna-slägterna.

English translation:

"Martha, daughter of Erik X, who was married to Nils Sixtensson of Tofta, and, through this marriage a progenitress strain for the Sparre and Oxenstjerna families."

Children
Allegedly, they had 2 children together,
Sixten Nilsson Sparre
Abjorn Nilsson Sparre

External links
Anteckningar om svenska qvinnor

Ancestry

References

House of Eric
People whose existence is disputed
Martha 1220
Daughters of kings